Kongō (金剛, Japanese equivalent of Vajra, translation variants include "Divine Thunder", "Indestructible Diamond" or "Indra's Spear", named for Mount Kongō) was a warship of the Imperial Japanese Navy during World War I and World War II. Her designer was the British naval engineer George Thurston, and she was laid down in 1911 at Barrow-in-Furness in Britain by Vickers Shipbuilding Company. Kongō was the last Japanese capital ship constructed outside Japan. She was formally commissioned in 1913, and patrolled off the Chinese coast during World War I.

Kongō underwent two major reconstructions. Beginning in 1929, the Imperial Japanese Navy rebuilt her as a battleship, strengthening her armor and improving her speed and power capabilities. In 1935, her superstructure was completely rebuilt, her speed was increased, and she was equipped with launch catapults for floatplanes. Now fast enough to accompany Japan's growing carrier fleet, Kongō was reclassified as a fast battleship. During the Second Sino-Japanese War, Kongō operated off the coast of mainland China before being redeployed to the Third Battleship Division in 1941. In 1942, she sailed as part of the Southern Force in preparation for the Battle of Singapore.

Kongō fought in many major naval actions of the Pacific War during World War II. She covered the Japanese Army's amphibious landings in British Malaya (part of present-day Malaysia) and the Dutch East Indies (now Indonesia) in 1942, before engaging American forces at the Battle of Midway and during the Guadalcanal Campaign. Throughout 1943, Kongō primarily remained at Truk Lagoon in the Caroline Islands, Kure Naval Base (near Hiroshima), Sasebo Naval Base (near Nagasaki), and Lingga Roads, and deployed several times in response to American aircraft carrier air raids on Japanese island bases scattered across the Pacific. Kongō participated in the Battle of the Philippine Sea and the Battle of Leyte Gulf in 1944 (22–23 October), engaging and sinking American vessels in the latter. Kongō was torpedoed and sunk by the submarine  while transiting the Formosa Strait on 21 November 1944. She was the only Japanese battleship sunk by submarine in the Second World War.

Design and construction

Kongō was the first of the Imperial Japanese Navy's Kongō-class battlecruisers, which were almost as large, costly and well-armed as battleships, but which traded off armored protection for higher speeds. These four battlecruisers of the Kongō class were designed to match the naval capabilities of the battlecruisers of the other major naval powers at the time, and they have been called the battlecruiser versions of the British (formerly Turkish) battleship . Their heavy armament of 14-inch naval guns and their armor protection (which took up about 23.3% of their approximately 30,000-ton displacements in 1913) were greatly superior to those of any other Japanese capital ship afloat at the time.

The keel of Kongō was laid down at Barrow-in-Furness by Vickers Shipbuilding and Engineering on 17 January 1911. Under Japan's contract with Vickers, the first vessel of the class was constructed in the United Kingdom, with the remainder built in Japan. Kongō was launched on 18 May 1912, and then transferred to the dockyards of Portsmouth, England, where her fitting-out began in mid-1912. All parts used in her construction were manufactured in the U.K. Kongō was completed on 16 April 1913.

Siemens-Vickers Scandal

In January 1914, a telegram leaked from Siemens' Tokyo office to Reuters along with further reporting by the New York Times and Asahi Shimbun led to an investigation by Japanese authorities which revealed a pattern of bribery and kickbacks by German and English armaments corporations. Siemens had been paying senior Japanese officials a secret 15% kickback, until Vickers had outbid them by offering 25%. Vickers had paid 210,000 yen to Admiral Fuji of the Imperial Japanese Navy procurement in 1911 and 1912, and 40,000 yen to Vice Admiral Kazu, related to obtaining the contract for building Kongō.  Kazu was court-martialed in May 1914, fined 400,000 yen and sentenced to 3 years in prison.  As a result of the Siemens-Vickers Scandal revolving around the contracts of building Kongō, the government of Prime Minister Yamamoto resigned March 23, 1914.  Senior executives of the Mitsui corporation, Japanese partners of Vickers, also resigned.

Armament
Kongōs main battery consisted of eight  heavy-caliber main naval guns in four twin turrets (two forward and two aft). The turrets were noted by the U.S. Office of Naval Intelligence to be "similar to the British 15-inch turrets", with improvements made in flash-tightness. Each of her main guns could fire high explosive or armor-piercing shells  at a rate of about two shells per minute. In keeping with the Japanese doctrine of deploying more powerful vessels before their opponents, Kongō and her sister ships were the first vessels in the world equipped with  guns. Her main guns carried ammunition for 90 shots, and they had an approximate barrel lifetime of 250 to 280 shots. In 1941, separate dyes were introduced for the armor-piercing shells of the four Kongō-class battleships to assist with targeting, with Kongōs armor-piercing shells using red dye.

The secondary battery of Kongō originally consisted of sixteen  50 calibre guns in single casemates located amidships ("50 calibre" means that the lengths of the guns were 50 times their bore, or 300 inches), eight  guns, and eight submerged  torpedo tubes. Her six-inch naval guns could fire five to six rounds per minute, with a barrel lifetime of about 500 rounds. The 6-inch/50 calibre gun was capable of firing both antiaircraft and antiship shells, though the positioning of these guns on Kongō made antiaircraft firing mostly impractical. During her second reconstruction, the older three-inch guns were removed and then replaced with eight  5-inch/40 calibre dual-purpose guns. These guns could fire from eight to 14 rounds per minute, with a barrel lifetime of about 800 to 1,500 rounds. Of Kongōs guns, the 5-inch guns had the widest variety of shell types: antiaircraft, antiship, and illumination shells. Kongō was also armed with many  antiaircraft machine guns. By October 1944, Kongōs secondary armament was reconfigured to eight  guns, eight  guns, and 122 Type 96 antiaircraft rapid-fire cannons.

Service history

1913–1929: Battlecruiser

On 16 August 1913, Kongō was completed and commissioned into the Imperial Japanese Navy (I.J.N.). Twelve days later, she departed from Portsmouth headed for Japan. She was docked at Singapore from 20 to 27 October, before arriving at Yokosuka Naval Arsenal on 5 November, where she was placed in First Reserve. In January 1914, she docked at Kure Naval Base for armament checks. On 3 August 1914, the German Empire declared war on France and then invaded via Belgium, sparking the beginning of World War I in the West. Twelve days later, Japan issued a warning to Kaiser Wilhelm II of the German Empire, ordering him to withdraw the German troops from their base at Tsingtao, China. When the German Empire did not respond, Japan declared war on Germany on 23 August, occupying the former German possessions in the Caroline Islands, Palau Islands, Marshall Islands, and Marianas Islands. Kongō was quickly deployed towards the Central Pacific to patrol the sea lines of communication of the German Empire. Kongō returned to the port of Yokosuka, Japan, on 12 September, and one month later, she was assigned to the First Battleship Division. In October, Kongō and her new sister ship  sortied off the Chinese coast in support of Japanese army units during the Siege of Tsingtao. Then Kongō returned to Sasebo Naval Base for upgrades to her searchlights. On 3 October 1915, Kongō and Hiei participated in the sinking of the old  as a practice target. She was a Russian pre-dreadnought that had been captured in 1905 during the Russo-Japanese War that had next served as an I.J.N. warship. With the defeat of the German East Asia Squadron by the Royal Navy at the Battle of the Falkland Islands in December 1914, there was little or no need for I.J.N. operations in the Pacific Ocean. Kongō spent the rest of World War I either based at Sasebo, or on patrol off the coast of China. In December 1918, following the end of the hostilities of World War I, Kongō was placed in "Second Reserve". In April 1919, she was fitted with a new seawater flooding system for her ammunition magazines.

With the conclusion of World War I, and the signing of the Washington Naval Treaty on 6 February 1922, the size of the I.J.N. was significantly limited, with a ratio of 5:5:3 required between the capital ships of the United Kingdom, the United States, and the Japanese Empire, since the latter was responsible for only one ocean, rather than the two of the other countries, and fewer warships for France and Italy. This Treaty also banned the signatories from building any new capital ships until 1931, with no capital ship permitted to exceed  in displacement. Provided that new additions did not exceed 3,000 tons of displacement, the existing capital ships were allowed to be upgraded with improved anti-torpedo bulges and armored main decks. By the time that the Washington Naval Treaty had been fully implemented in Japan, only three classes of World War I type capital ships remained active: the s, the Kongō-class battlecruisers, and the s.

In April 1923, Kongō gave transportation to Crown Prince Hirohito during his official visit to the Japanese possession of Taiwan. On 14 June 1924, she collided with Submarine No. 62 during maneuvers. In November 1924, Kongo docked at Yokosuka, where modifications were made to her main armament, increasing the elevation of her main guns and improving her fire-control systems. In 1927, Kongō underwent major modifications to her superstructure, rebuilding it into the pagoda mast style to accommodate the growing number of fire-control systems for her main guns. In May 1928, her steering equipment was upgraded, before she was placed in reserve in preparation for major modifications and reconstruction in 1929–31.

1929–1935: Reconstruction into battleship

Prohibited by the Washington Treaty from constructing new capital ships until 1931, Japan resorted to upgrading their World War I era battleships and battlecruisers. Beginning in September 1929, Kongō underwent extensive modernization and modification in drydock at Yokosuka Naval Arsenal. Over the next two years, Kongōs horizontal armor near her ammunition magazines was strengthened, and the machinery spaces within the hull were given increased torpedo protection. Anti-torpedo bulges were added along the waterline, as permitted by the Washington Treaty. She was refitted to accommodate three Type 90 Model 0 floatplanes, though no aircraft catapults were fitted. To increase her speed and power, all 36 of her Yarrow boilers were removed, and then replaced with 16 newer boilers, and Brown-Curtis direct-drive turbines were installed. Kongōs forward funnel was removed, and her second funnel was enlarged and lengthened. The modifications to her hull increased her armor weight from 6,502 to 10,313 long tons, directly violating the terms of the Washington Naval Treaty. In March 1931, Kongō—now capable of a speed of —was reclassified as a battleship.

On 22 April 1930, Japan signed the London Naval Treaty, placing further restrictions on the signatories' naval forces. Several of her older battleships were scrapped, and no new capital ships were built as replacements. After minor fitting-out work, Kongōs reconstruction begun in September 1929 and was declared complete on 31 March 1931. On 1 December 1931, two months after the Japanese invasion of Manchuria, Kongō was assigned to the First Battleship Division and also designated the flagship of the Combined Fleet. Additional rangefinders and searchlights were fitted to her superstructure in January 1932, and Captain Nobutake Kondō assumed command of the vessel in December. In 1933, aircraft catapults were fitted between the two rear turrets.

On 25 February 1933, following a report by the Lytton Commission, the League of Nations agreed that Japan's invasion of China had violated Chinese sovereignty. Refusing to accept the judgement of this organization, Japan withdrew from the League of Nations on the same day. Japan also immediately withdrew from the Washington Naval Treaty and the London Naval Treaty, thus removing all restrictions on the numbers and sizes of her capital warships. In November 1934, Kongō was placed in Second Reserve in preparation for further modifications. On 10 January 1935, Kongō was toured by the Nazi German naval attaché to Japan, Captain Paul Wenneker, as part of a gunnery demonstration.

1935–1941: Fast battleship

On 1 June 1935, Kongō was dry-docked at Yokosuka Naval Arsenal in preparation for upgrades that would enable her to escort Japan's growing fleet of aircraft carriers. In addition, her bridge was completely reconstructed according to Japan's pagoda mast style of forward superstructure, and catapults were added to support three Nakajima E8N or Kawanishi E7K reconnaissance and spotter floatplanes.

Kongōs armor was also extensively upgraded. This reconstruction was finished on 8 January 1937.

In February 1937, Kongō was assigned to the Sasebo Naval District, and in December she was placed under the command of Takeo Kurita in the Third Battleship Division. In April 1938, two float planes from Kongō bombed the Chinese city of Fuzhou during the Second Sino-Japanese War. Throughout 1938 and 1939, Kongō steamed off the Chinese coast in support of Japanese Army operations during the war. In November 1939, Captain Raizo Tanaka assumed command of Kongō. From November 1940 to April 1941, additional armor was added to Kongōs armament barbettes and ammunition tubes, while ventilation and firefighting equipment was also improved.

1942: Pacific War service
Kongō and Haruna departed from the Hashirajima fleet anchorage on 29 November 1941 to begin the War in the Pacific as part of the Southern (Malay) Force's Main Body, under the overall command of Vice-Admiral Nobutake Kondō. On 4 December 1941, the Main Body arrived off the coast of southern Thailand and northern Malaya in preparation for the invasion of Thailand and the Malayan Peninsula four days later. When Britain's "Force Z"—consisting of the battleship  and the battlecruiser —was quickly defeated by Japan's land-based aircraft from southern Vietnam, Kongōs battlegroup withdrew from Malayan waters. This battlegroup subsequently sortied from Indochina for three days in mid-December to protect a reinforcement convoy traveling to Malaya, and again on 18 December to cover the Japanese Army's landing at Lingayen Gulf, Luzon, in the Philippines. The Main Body departed Cam Ranh Bay in French Indochina on 23 December bound for Taiwan, arriving two days later. In January 1942, Kongō and the heavy cruisers  and  provided distant cover for air attacks on Ambon Island.

On 21 February, Kongō was joined by Haruna, four fast aircraft carriers, five heavy cruisers and numerous support ships in preparation for "Operation J", Japan's invasion of the Dutch East Indies. On 25 February, the Third Battleship Division provided cover for air attacks on the Island of Java. Kongō bombarded Christmas Island off the western coast of Australia on 7 March 1942, and then she returned to Staring-baai for 15 days of standby alert. In April 1942, Kongō joined five fleet carriers in attacks on Colombo and Trincomalee on Ceylon. On the same day, Japanese air attacks sank the carrier, and Kongō was attacked but missed by nine British medium bombers. Having crippled the offensive capability of Britain's Eastern Fleet, the Third Battleship Division returned to Japan. Kongō reached Sasebo on 22 April. From 23 April to 2 May, Kongō was drydocked for reconfiguration of her antiaircraft armament.

Following the disastrous loss of four of the Combined Fleet's fast carriers on 4 June 1942, Kondō's force withdrew to Japan. On 14 July she was assigned as the flagship of the restructured Third Battleship Division. In August, Kongō was drydocked at Kure to receive surface-detection radar and additional range finders. In September, Kongō embarked with Hiei, Haruna, Kirishima, three carriers, and numerous smaller warships in response to the U.S. Marine Corps's amphibious landing on Guadalcanal in the Solomon Islands. On 20 September, this task force was ordered to return to the Truk Naval Base in the Central Pacific north of the equator.

In the aftermath of the Battle of Cape Esperance, the Japanese Army opted to reinforce its troops on Guadalcanal. To protect their transport convoy from enemy air attack, Admiral Isoroku Yamamoto sent Haruna and Kongō, escorted by one light cruiser and nine destroyers, to bombard the American air base at Henderson Field. Because of their high speeds, these two battleships could bombard the airfield and then withdraw before being subjected to air attack from either land-based warplanes or American aircraft carriers. In the most successful Japanese battleship action of the war, the bombardment heavily damaged both runways, destroyed almost all of the U.S. Marines' aviation fuel, destroyed or damaged 48 of the Marines' 90 warplanes, and killed 41 Marines. A large Japanese troop and supply convoy reached Guadalcanal on the next day.

During the Battle of the Santa Cruz Islands on 26 October 1942, Kongō was attacked by four Grumman TBF Avenger torpedo bombers, but she received no hits. In mid-November, this battleship and other warships provided distant cover for the unsuccessful mission by the I.J.N. to bombard Henderson Field again and to deliver more Army reinforcements to Guadalcanal. On 15 November 1942, following the Japanese defeat and the sinking of Hiei and Kirishima during the Naval Battle of Guadalcanal, the Third Battleship Division returned to Truk, where it remained for the rest of 1942.

1943: Movement between bases

Throughout 1943, Kongō engaged no enemy targets. In late January 1943, she participated in "Operation Ke" as part of a diversionary and distant covering force to support I.J.N. destroyers that were evacuating Army troops from Guadalcanal. From 15 February through 20 February 1943, the Third Battleship Division was transferred from Truk to the Kure Naval Base. On 27 February, Kongō was drydocked to receive upgrades to her antiaircraft armament, with the additions of two triple 25 mm gun mounts and the removal of two of her 6-inch turrets, while additional concrete protection was added near her steering gear. On 17 May 1943, in response to the U.S. Army's invasion of Attu Island, Kongō sortied alongside , the Third Battleship Division, two fleet carriers, two cruisers, and nine destroyers. Three days later, the American submarine  spotted this naval task force, but she was unable to attack it. On 22 May 1943, the task force arrived in Yokosuka, where it was joined by an additional three fleet carriers and two light cruisers. This force was disbanded when Attu fell to the U.S. Army before the necessary preparations for a counterattack had been finished.

On 17 October 1943, Kongō again left Truk as part of a larger task force consisting of five battleships, three fleet carriers, eight heavy cruisers, three light cruisers, and numerous destroyers. These sortied in response to U.S. Navy air raids on Wake Island. No contact between the two forces was made, and the Japanese task force returned to Truk on 26 October 1943. She soon left Truk for home waters, and on 16 December 1943, Kongō arrived at Sasebo for refits and training in the Inland Sea.

1944: Combat and loss

In January 1944, Kongō was dry-docked for a reconfiguration of her anti-aircraft suite. Four 6-inch guns and a pair of twin 25 mm mounts were removed and replaced with six twin 5-inch guns and four triple 25 mm mounts. The Third Battleship Division departed from Kure on 8 March 1944. Arriving at Lingga on 14 March 1944, the division remained for training until 11 May 1944. On 11 May 1944, Kongō and Admiral Ozawa's Mobile Fleet departed from Lingga bound for Tawitawi, where they were joined by Vice-Admiral Takeo Kurita's "Force C". On 13 June, Ozawa's Mobile Fleet departed from Tawitawi bound for the Mariana Islands. During the Battle of the Philippine Sea, Kongō escorted Japanese fast carriers, and remained undamaged in counterattacks from US carrier aircraft on 20 June. When she returned to Japan, 13 triple and 40 single 25-mm mounts were added to her anti-aircraft armament, for a total of over 100 mounts. In August, two more 6-inch guns were removed and another eighteen single mounts installed.

In October 1944, Kongō departed from Lingga in preparation for "Operation Sho-1", Japan's counterattack during the Battle of Leyte Gulf, the largest naval engagement in history. On 24 October, Kongō was undamaged by several near misses from American carrier aircraft in the Battle of the Sibuyan Sea. On 25 October, during the Battle off Samar, Kongō—as part of Admiral Kurita's Centre Force—engaged the US 7th Fleet's "Taffy 3", a battlegroup of escort carriers and destroyers. At 09:12, she sank the destroyer escort . After a fierce defensive action by the American ships, which sank three Japanese heavy cruisers, Admiral Kurita elected to withdraw, ending the battle. While retreating, Kongō suffered damage from five near misses from attacking aircraft. The fleet arrived at Brunei on 28 October.

On 20 November, they entered the Formosa Strait. Maneuvering into position at 02:45, Sealion fired six bow torpedoes at Kongō followed by three stern torpedoes at Nagato fifteen minutes later. One minute after the first salvo was launched, two of the torpedoes were seen to hit Kongō on the port side, while a third sank the destroyer  with all hands. The torpedoes flooded two of Kongōs boiler rooms, but she was still able to make . Within fifteen minutes of detaching from the main force, Kongō was listing 45 degrees and flooding uncontrollably. At 5:18 the ship lost all power and the order was given to abandon ship. At 5:24, while the evacuation was under way, the forward 14-inch magazine exploded, and the broken ship sank quickly, with the loss of over 1,200 of her crew, including the commander of the Third Battleship Division and her captain.

She was one of only three British-built battleships sunk by submarine attack during World War II.

See also
 List by death toll of ships sunk by submarines

References

Citations

Footnotes

Bibliography
 Boyle, David (1998). World War II in Photographs. London. Rebo Productions. .

 
 Jackson, Robert (2000).  The World's Great Battleships. Dallas: Brown Books. .
 Jackson, Robert (editor) (2008). 101 Great Warships. London: Amber Books. .

 McCurtie, Francis (1989) [1945]. Jane's Fighting Ships of World War II. London: Bracken Books. .
 
 Schom, Alan (2004). The Eagle and the Rising Sun; The Japanese-American War, 1941–1943. New York: Norton & Company. .
 Steinberg, Rafael (1980) Return to the Philippines. New York: Time-Life Books Inc. .
 Stille, Cdr Mark (2008). Imperial Japanese Navy Battleship 1941–1945. Oxford: Osprey Publishing. .
 Swanston, Alexander & Swanston, Malcolm (2007). The Historical Atlas of World War II. London: Cartographica Press Ltd. .
 
 Willmott, H.P. & Keegan, John [1999] (2002). The Second World War in the Far East. Smithsonian Books. .

External links 

 The Japanese Battle Cruiser Kongo (Journal of the American Society of Naval Engineers, Inc. technical article, 1912)

1912 ships
Ships built in Barrow-in-Furness
Kongō-class battlecruisers
Ships sunk by American submarines
Shipwrecks in the Taiwan Strait
Vickers
Second Sino-Japanese War naval ships of Japan
World War II battleships of Japan
World War II shipwrecks in the Pacific Ocean
Maritime incidents in 1924
Maritime incidents in November 1944
World War II shipwrecks in the South China Sea
Naval magazine explosions